The Bible Belt is a strip of land in the Netherlands with the highest concentration of conservative orthodox Reformed Protestants in the country. Although the term is of recent origin (named by analogy after the Bible Belt of the United States) the Dutch Bible Belt has existed for many generations.

This Bible Belt stretches from Zeeland in the southwest, through the West-Betuwe and Veluwe in the center of the country, to parts of the province Overijssel in the northeast. Municipalities in this area include Yerseke, Tholen, Ouddorp, Opheusden, Kesteren, Barneveld, Nunspeet, Elspeet and Staphorst. The three biggest cities regarded to be part of the Bible Belt are Ede, Veenendaal and Kampen. In Overijssel, the Bible belt is more dispersed and not always contiguous from one municipality to the next. Pockets exist such as in Rijssen. 

Some communities with strong conservative Reformed leanings are situated far outside the belt. For example, some municipalities of Friesland such as Dantumadiel have characteristics typical of the Bible Belt. Similarly Urk, considered by many as one of the most traditional communities in the country, is separated from the Bible Belt by the Noordoostpolder which is a polder created in 1942.

The various conservative orthodox Calvinist denominations, such as the Old-Reformed Congregations in the Netherlands, have a combined official membership of about 400,000 people, approximately 2.5% of the entire population, although other sources estimates their share at about 7%.

History

When Flanders and North Brabant were reconquered by the Spanish army during the Eighty Years' War, their Protestant inhabitants were required to either convert to Catholicism or leave. Many emigrated north of the border, particularly during the Twelve Years' Truce of 1609–21. Many of them later became staunch supporters of the pietist movement known as the nadere reformatie (further reformation). 
Following the 1832 schism, known as the Afscheiding ("Secession"), and the 1886 schism, Doleantie ("Sorrow"), which was led by Abraham Kuyper, they left the mainstream Dutch Reformed Church and founded their own, more conservative congregations, the most notable of which are the Christian Reformed Churches and the Reformed Congregations ("Gereformeerde Gemeenten"), known colloquially as zwarte-kousenkerken ("black stockings churches").

The Bible Belt differs in many aspects (amongst them a regular Sunday church attendance – often twice on a Sunday) from the traditionally Catholic provinces of North Brabant and Limburg to the south (where Sunday church attendance averages between 2% to 3% of the population) and northern parts of the Netherlands, which are traditionally mainline Protestant (dominated by the Protestant Church in the Netherlands) and increasingly secular, with similarly low church attendance figures.

Life and tradition
The church plays a central role in the life of Bible Belt communities and they typically oppose the liberal practices of mainstream Dutch society, such as euthanasia, gay rights, abortion, prostitution, and pornography. In Staphorst, for instance, swearing is discouraged, many women wear skirts or dresses, and the automated bank machine is closed on Sundays. In Bible Belt communities, strong religious tone in public life is accompanied by conservative outlook, preference for large families (the region has relatively high fertility rates), and an emphasis on traditional values. An aspect of Bible Belt society that has drawn the attention of the Dutch general public in recent years (when concerns of a measles epidemic emerged) is the suspicion of parents towards state-run vaccination programmes.

The Bible Belt provides a base of support for the Reformed Political Party (SGP) and Christian Union (CU).

See also 

 Bible Belt (disambiguation)

References

Further reading
 Hans Knippenberg, "Secularization in the Netherlands in its historical and geographical dimensions," GeoJournal (1998) 45#3 pp 209–220. online
 Tomáš Sobotka and Feray Adigüzel, "Religiosity and spatial demographic differences in the Netherlands" (2002) online

Cultural regions
Bible belts
Calvinism in the Netherlands
Conservatism in the Netherlands
Society of the Netherlands
Culture of Gelderland
Culture of Overijssel
Culture of South Holland
Culture of Utrecht (province)
Culture of Zeeland